is a species of ground beetle from the  subfamily that can be found in Italy and on the island of Sicily.

References

External links
Brachinus italicus on Flickr

Brachininae
Beetles described in 1831
Beetles of Europe